Selo is a village in the Vipava Valley in the Municipality of Ajdovščina in the Littoral region of Slovenia.

It is made up of smaller clusters of the hamlets of Britih, Barkula, Mandrija, Na Vasi/Na Gorici, Bauč, Gornji Konc, and Maitov Hrib.

Church

The local church is dedicated to the Archangel Michael and belongs to the Parish of Batuje.

References

External links 

Selo at Geopedia

Populated places in the Municipality of Ajdovščina